Karie may refer to the following:

Karie, Indian film
Karie (name)

See also

Kahimi Karie (album)
Kare (disambiguation)
Kari (disambiguation)
Karik (disambiguation)
Karim (disambiguation)
Karin (disambiguation)
Kariz (disambiguation)
Karle (disambiguation)
Katie (disambiguation)
Kyrie (disambiguation)